Nurul Islam is a Bangladeshi economist. Islam is noted for his part in the independence war of Bangladesh from Pakistan in the early seventies as well as for his leadership role in the economy, from 1972 to 1975,  as the Deputy Chairman of the Planning Commission. He was one of the closest advisors to, and confidants of, Sheikh Mujibur Rahman, the founding father and first Prime Minister of Bangladesh, and also the father of the current prime minister. Islam has mentored many Bengali political and power players (including Fakhruddin Ahmed and Muhammad Yunus).

He served as the Deputy Chairman of the first Planning Commission of Bangladesh. He is a primary contributor to the 6-Point Programme presented to the West Pakistan government during the struggle for independence.  In 1961, Islam, Rehman Sobhan and Habibur Rehman organised a seminar on the economic disparities between West and East Pakistan, which was instrumental in stirring up support for independence.

He received the Bangladesh Bank Award (2009) for his  contributions to theoretical and applied development economics. He has authored 29 books.

Background and education
Islam grew up in Chittagong. He completed his IA from Chittagong College. After studying in Presidency college, Calcutta and the University of Dhaka, he earned his PhD in economics from Harvard University in 1955.

Career
Islam joined the University of Dhaka as an associate professor of economics in 1960. In 1965, he left the university to become the director of the Pakistan Institute of Development Economics (later Bangladesh Institute of Development Studies), and government cabinet minister as Head of the first Planning Commission of Bangladesh. He returned to Dhaka in 1969.

Islam was a Nuffield Foundation fellow at the London School of Economics and at Cambridge University. He also served as a Rockefeller fellow at the Netherlands School of Economics, and was a fellow at St Antony's College, Oxford.

Islam served as the Assistant Director General, Economic and Social Policy Department of Food and Agriculture Organization (FAO) and as the head of the Bangladesh Planning Commission (a cabinet-level post) of the first Government of Bangladesh during 1972–75.

Works
 Development Strategy of Bangladesh (1978)
 Development Planning in Bangladesh: A Study in Political Economy (1979)
 Foodgrain Price Stabilization in Developing Countries: Issues and Experiences in Asia (1996)
 Exploration in Development Issues: Selected Articles of Nurul Islam (2003)
 Making of a Nation, Bangladesh: An Economist's Tale (2003)
 An Odyssey: The Journey of My Life (2017)

Personal life
As of 2021, Islam resides with his wife Rowshan in Potomac, Maryland and Washington, D.C.

He is the father of economist Roumeen Islam, and entrepreneur Nayeem Islam. His granddaughter Leila Islam is a student at Stanford Graduate School of Business.

Awards
 Bangladesh Bank Award (2009)
 BDI Lifetime Achievement Award (2013)

References

Further reading
 

Year of birth missing (living people)
Living people
Academic staff of the University of Dhaka
Bangladeshi economists
Harvard Graduate School of Arts and Sciences alumni
University of Dhaka alumni
Fellows of St Antony's College, Oxford
Bangladesh Krishak Sramik Awami League central committee members